The Sociological Quarterly (TSQ) is a quarterly peer-reviewed academic journal published by Taylor and Francis for the Midwest Sociological Society. It covers all areas of sociology and publishes both quantitative and qualitative research. The current editors-in-chief are Michael A. Long and Andrew S. Fullerton (Oklahoma State University) and the deputy editor is Jonathan S. Coley (Oklahoma State University).

The Quarterly started in 1939 as The Midwest Sociologist, making TSQ among the oldest broad interest sociological journals in the U.S.   Previous editors of TSQ were: 

In 1959, the title changed to The Sociological Quarterly, with the following editors having 
served since then:

According to the Journal Citation Reports, the journal has a 2019 5-year impact factor of 2.459.

References

External links 
 

English-language journals
Publications established in 1960
Quarterly journals
Sociology journals
Routledge academic journals